Kimverlie Soriano Molina (born July 1, 1991), popularly known as Kim Molina, is a Filipino singer and actress, known for portraying Aileen in the long-running Filipino stage musical Rak Of Aegis (2014—present), Savannah in the drama series Kadenang Ginto (2018), Peng in the digital iWant movie MOMOL Nights (2019), and Elsa in the mainstream film #Jowable (2019).

Personal life
Kim grew up in Saudi Arabia where her parents work. Her father is a well-established dentist. She studied in Al Jazeera International School in Dammam.

Early life and Career

Singing
Kim started singing at the age of two. She began performing as front act to local Filipino artists' in the Middle East shows at the age of five. At 14, she won ABS-CBN's Middle East search for The Filipino Channel Pop Star, besting winners from Kuwait, Bahrain, Saudi, and Dubai. In 2009 she was chosen to represent the Middle East to the World Championships of the Performing Arts in Los Angeles, California. She was a multi-medalist and was awarded the title Senior Grand Champion Vocalist Of The World.

Theater
As a stage actress, she had her professional theatre debut with Viva Atlantis' production of Disney's Tarzan in 2013. She was then included in the original Asian cast of Carrie: the Musical as Frieda, and played the role of Oda Mae Brown's younger sister Louise in the musical stage adaptation of the movie Ghost, both under Atlantis Productions.

In June 2014, Kim got her first lead theatre role as Aileen (alternating with Aicelle Santos) in the hit Pinoy musical Rak of Aegis. For her performance in Rak of Aegis, she was awarded Best Actress in a Musical by Gawad Buhay. She then landed projects for television and film. 

In March 2023, Kim returned to the theatre scene as Zsazsa Zaturnnah in Zsazsa Zaturnnah the Musical... 'Yun Lang!, produced by the Ateneo Blue Repertory and under the direction of Missy Maramara.

Television & Film

At the 2015 Metro Manila Film Festival, she earned a Best Supporting Actress award nomination for her portrayal of Luli in #WalangForever, which starred Jennylyn Mercado and was directed by Dan Villegas.

In 2016, she starred in Camp Sawi alongside Bela Padilla, Arci Muñoz, Yassi Pressman, and Andi Eigenmann. The film was produced by VIVA Films and N2, and directed by Irene Villamor.

In 2017, Kim was awarded Best Performance by a Female Recording Artist in the Awit Awards for her debut single "Naluluha Ako" under Viva Records. 

She starred alongside Sarah Geronimo in the 2018 Philippine adaptation of the Korean movie musical, Miss Granny.

In 2019, Kim top-billed in two films: first, in the digital iWant movie Momol Nights alongside actor Kit Thompson, then in her debut mainstream film #Jowable on Netflix. Because of the box office success of her films that year, she was awarded Most Promising Female Star for Movies at the 51st Guillermo Mendoza Awards 2020 Box Office Entertainment Awards.

In October 2020, she was chosen to be one of the Celebrity Judge Detectives of Masked Singer Pilipinas, the Philippine edition of The Masked Singer franchise that followed a 2nd season on 2022. She also hosted the 2nd season of TV 5’s Born To Be A Star alongside Mateo Guidicelli.

Business
Amidst juggling work as a singer and actress, coping with adjustments in the middle of Covid pandemic, Kim still pursued her dream of starting her own company. She founded a pet clothing line - Boopy Pet, October of 2021, followed by the launch of MN Health & Wellness Corporation’s FITMIX in January 2022, alongside her business and on-and-off screen partner Jerald Napoles.

Filmography

Television

Movies

Theatre

Discography

Released single

Recorded album

Awards and recognitions

Singer

Theatre actress

Actress (Movies/TV)

References

External links

1991 births
Living people
21st-century Filipino actresses
21st-century Filipino women singers
Actresses from Manila
Filipino film actresses
Filipino musical theatre actresses
Filipino television actresses
Singers from Manila